Synclera chlorophasma is a moth in the family Crambidae. It was described by Arthur Gardiner Butler in 1878. It is found in Jamaica and Honduras.

References

Moths described in 1878
Spilomelinae